The 1947 Boston Red Sox season was the 47th season in the franchise's Major League Baseball history. The Red Sox finished third in the American League (AL) with a record of 83 wins and 71 losses, 14 games behind the New York Yankees, who went on to win the 1947 World Series.

Red Sox left fielder Ted Williams won the Triple Crown, leading the AL in home runs (32), runs batted in (114), and batting average (.343).

Offseason 
 November 1, 1946: Virgil Stallcup drafted from the Red Sox by the Cincinnati Reds in the 1946 rule 5 draft.
 November 17, 1946: Tom Poholsky was drafted from the Red Sox by the St. Louis Cardinals in the 1946 minor league draft.
 March 1947: Frankie Hayes was signed as a free agent by the Red Sox.

Regular season 
After a memorable 1946 season, the Red Sox added lights to Fenway Park for the first time. 1947 looked like another big year for Boston, but Boo Ferriss, Mickey Harris, and Tex Hughson all had arm trouble, and from 62 wins in 1946 they dropped to 29 in 1947. Boston finished 3rd, 21 wins less than their American League Championship season a year earlier, 14 games behind the eventual world champion New York Yankees. Joe Dobson was the top winner with 18 wins, and Ted Williams hit .343, with 32 homers and 114 RBIs, to secure his second Triple Crown.

On July 20, Hank Thompson and Willard Brown of the St. Louis Browns played against the Boston Red Sox. It was the first time that two black players appear in a major league game together since 1884.

Season standings

Record vs. opponents

Opening Day lineup

Notable transactions 
 May 20, 1947: Hal Wagner was traded to the Detroit Tigers for Birdie Tebbetts.
 May 21, 1947: Frankie Hayes was released.

Roster

Player stats

Batting

Starters by position 
Note: Pos = Position; G = Games played; AB = At bats; H = Hits; Avg. = Batting average; HR = Home runs; RBI = Runs batted in

Other batters 
Note: G = Games played; AB = At bats; H = Hits; Avg. = Batting average; HR = Home runs; RBI = Runs batted in

Pitching

Starting pitchers 
Note: G = Games pitched; IP = Innings pitched; W = Wins; L = Losses; ERA = Earned run average; SO = Strikeouts

Other pitchers 
Note: G = Games pitched; IP = Innings pitched; W = Wins; L = Losses; ERA = Earned run average; SO = Strikeouts

Relief pitchers 
Note: G = Games pitched; W = Wins; L = Losses; SV = Saves; ERA = Earned run average; SO = Strikeouts

Farm system 

LEAGUE CHAMPIONS: Roanoke

References

External links
1947 Boston Red Sox team page at Baseball Reference
1947 Boston Red Sox season at baseball-almanac.com

Boston Red Sox seasons
Boston Red Sox
Boston Red Sox
1940s in Boston